Israeli Students Organization was founded in 1998 and incorporated as an association. The group paralleled "National Union of Israeli Students" which incorporated student unions of seven universities in Israel and several other colleges. Organization were members of 30 fraternities throughout the State of Israel and totaled one hundred thousand students.

The organization filed petitions to the High Court on various issues, organized demonstrations, strikes and protests. At the end of the term of the 16th Knesset in 2005, managed enterprise, after five years of struggle, to transfer "correction Law for Higher Education supported by Members of Knesset "Amir Peretz, Inbal Gavrieli" and others. The law said the change in composition Council for Higher Education in Israel and met with the chairman of the organization as a student representative council of higher education colleges.

The organization aims to increase the participation of Israeli student affairs on the political agenda. Among other things the organization has the High Court against the Ministry of Transport equality discounts for students from colleges.

After the 2006 Lebanon War, joined the reservists protest organization claim for a commission of inquiry to investigate the conduct of political and military echelons in the war. Join students but has expanded its struggle also raised objections among the students about the organization's preoccupation with matters unrelated to the students.

In 2009, after a decade of a separate activity, often without cooperation, student organization united with the national student union, and ceased to operate as a separate entity.

Groups of students' unions
Student organizations in Israel
Student organizations established in 1998
1998 establishments in Israel